Henrysin may refer to the following places:
 Henrysin, Lublin Voivodeship (east Poland)
 Henrysin, Nowy Dwór Mazowiecki County in Masovian Voivodeship (east-central Poland)
 Henrysin, Sokołów County in Masovian Voivodeship (east-central Poland)
 Henrysin, Wyszków County in Masovian Voivodeship (east-central Poland)